Chantry Mill is a  geological Site of Special Scientific Interest in Storrington in West Sussex. It is a Geological Conservation Review site.

This site provides the best exposure of the junction between the Gault and Folkestone Beds of the Wealden Group, dating to around 140 million years ago in the Early Cretaceous.

A public footpath runs along the south-western edge of the site.

References

Sites of Special Scientific Interest in West Sussex
Geological Conservation Review sites